Gorleston-on-Sea railway station was a station in Gorleston-on-Sea in Norfolk. It was on the line between Great Yarmouth and Lowestoft which closed in 1970. The station was demolished after closure and the site is now occupied by the A47 road.

References

External links
 Webpage including a picture of the station in 1975
 Webpage including old map with Gorleston North and Gorleston on Sea stations
 Gorleston on Sea station in late 1960s when one track had been removed.
 Gorleston on Sea station at BerneyArms website.

Disused railway stations in Norfolk
Former Norfolk and Suffolk Joint Railway stations
Railway stations in Great Britain opened in 1903
Railway stations in Great Britain closed in 1970
Gorleston-on-Sea
Beeching closures in England